Boa Amponsem Senior High School is a public co-educational senior high school named after Boamponsem, a Denkyirahene or a former ruler of Denkyira. It is located in Dunkwa-on-Offin in the Upper Denkyira East Municipality of the Central Region of Ghana. It was established in 1961. The school won One-eighth Stage of Ghana National Science and Maths Quiz, 2020 contest by one point, after facing tough competition from the only all-female school to qualify from the Bono-Ahafo Zone – Our Lady of Mount Carmel Girls’ SHS.

Courses
The school offers courses Such as General Arts, Business, Agricultural Science, Visual Art, Home Science, and General Science.

The current headmistress of the school is Mrs Grace Anopong, the assistant headmaster is Mr. Alexander Austin Kotun, and the senior house master is Mr. Abubakar Iddrisu.

Notable alumni 
 Nana Amoakoh

References

External links

High schools in Ghana
Central Region (Ghana)
Educational institutions established in 1961
1961 establishments in Ghana